Kirchbach may refer to:

Places
Kirchbach (Gräbenackers Bach), a river of Hesse, Germany, tributary of the Gräbenackers Bach
Kirchbach, Carinthia, a market town in the Austrian state of Carinthia
Kirchbach in Steiermark, a former municipality in the Austrian state of Styria
Kirchbach-Zerlach, a municipality in the Austrian state of Styria

Surname
Esther von Kirchbach (1894–1946), German journalist, poet and chaplain of the Confessing Church
Frank Kirchbach (1859-1912), German painter, graphic designer and illustrator
Gunar Kirchbach (born 1971), German sprint canoer
Günther von Kirchbach (1850–1925), German Generaloberst who served during the First World War
Hans von Kirchbach (1849–1928), Royal Saxon army officer who was Generaloberst in the First World War
Hugo von Kirchbach (1809–1887), Prussian general in the Franco-Prussian War
Wolfgang Kirchbach (1857–1906), German critic and writer
Surnames of German origin
German-language surnames